Seh-Dong-Hong-Beh (meaning, "God Speaks true") was a leader of the Dahomey Amazons. In 1851, she led an all-female army consisting of 6,000 warriors against the Egba fortress of Abeokuta, to obtain slaves from the Egba people for the Dahomey slave trade.

Her age and date of death is unknown. She could have been in her late teens, 20s or early 30s when mentioned in 1850, since she was a leader of the Amazons and was pictured in her physical prime. Many Amazons were enlisted as small girls of between 8 or 10 years of age; a number of them would have been killed early in any battle that they fought in.  
An inconclusive guess would be that she could have been born sometime between 1815 and 1835, assuming she was aged between the late teens and the early 30s in 1850. She was not mentioned by the French army during the Dahomey-French wars, so she might have died in battle or retired at any time between 1851, 1874—the year of the first skirmishes with the French army—, or 1889—the year of the First Franco-Dahomean War.

She was portrayed in a hand drawn, partially colored portrait in her uniform, armed with a musket and holding a captive's severed head, in the 1851 book "Dahomey and the Dahomans" by Frederick Edwyn Forbes, a British Navy Commander and member of the Royal Geographical Society. As a deeply convinced abolitionist, he traveled to the Dahomey kingdom in 1849–50 with the mission of convincing king Guezo to stop the African slave trade. He described the female Dahomeyan army in detail, commenting on their lifestyle and behaviour as inserts in his negative descriptions and observations of the Dahomey wars that serviced the slave trade.

F. E. Forbes was not the only naval officer trying to end the slave trade in West Africa that mentioned the Dahomey female army.

As quoted from the book about her king, commander and ceremonial husband, the Dahomeyan king Guezo, in the years 1850–1852:
In order to bring an end to slave dealing, the British Navy went in search of the final traders and offered them large sums of money in exchange for firm promises to give up their lucrative business. Guezo, King of Dahomey had an army of 3,000 women, to each of whom he was married, having sold all the menfolk as slaves. For entertainment he indulged in the sacrifice of trespassers from neighbouring West African countries. He welcomed the approach of the naval officers, declaring Victoria and Albert as his closest friends.

References

African women in war
19th century in the Kingdom of Dahomey
Women in 19th-century warfare
Year of birth unknown
Year of death missing
Beninese women
Beninese military personnel